Aït Aissa Mimoune, Kabyle name Ath Aissa Mimoune, known formerly Djebel Aïssa Mimoun, is a commune (borough) in the District of Ouaguenoun, Tizi Ouzou Province, Kabylie region, Algeria.

Commune of Aït Aissa Mimoune
Its headquarters are in Labdhahi. The commune includes 23 villages: 
 Agharmiou
 Agouni Taga
 Aït Khelfats
 Aït Brahem (Ath Brahem)
 Akaoudj
 Akhrib Azza
 Asma
 Boussouar
 Dhalouth
 El Kelâa
 Ighil Bouchène
 Igounane Ameur (Laziv)
 Ikhelouiyène
 Imkechrene
 Menâam
 Mendjeh
 Oumlil
 Thahanouts
 Thala Gahia
 Thimeli
 Timizart Boualim
 Tizi Tekharoubt
 Thizi Tzougarth

See also

Communes of Algeria

References

External links
 

Populated places in Tizi Ouzou Province
Tizi Ouzou Province